Roberto Tacchini (born December 14, 1940 in Rapallo) is a retired Italian professional football player.

1940 births
Living people
Italian footballers
Serie A players
Inter Milan players
S.S.C. Bari players
Association football midfielders